A cremeschnitte (Bosnian and , ,), also known as vanilla slice or custard slice, is a custard and chantilly cream cream cake dessert commonly associated with the former Austro-Hungarian Monarchy. However, its exact origin is unknown. This dish remains popular across Central Europe and the Balkans in various variations, all of which include a puff pastry base and custard cream.

By country

In Austria

In Slovenia
In Slovenia, kremna rezina is commonly associated with the town of Bled, an Alpine tourist destination in northwestern Slovenia. The recipe cake was brought to the local Hotel Park in 1953 by Ištvan Lukačević, chef of the hotel's confectionery store. He came to Bled from Serbia where a similar cake was already known. As of October 2009, 10 million cream cakes have been baked at the hotel's patisserie since its invention. The name of the dessert means simply "cream slice". Most locals refer to it as kremšnita, from the German word Cremeschnitte, with the same meaning. While the kremna rezina from Bled celebrated their 10th million piece production, Slaščičarna Lenček, which is located in Domžale, in year 2013 celebrated the 75th anniversary since they have made their first one which is called  Lenčkova kremna rezina.

In Croatia

In Croatia, the two most popular variants are Samoborska kremšnita from the town of Samobor and Zagrebačka kremšnita from the capital, Zagreb. The extremely popular Samoborska kremšnita is characterized by having a puff pastry top, predominantly custard cream filling (less whipped cream) with meringue and is finished with powdered sugar. Zagrebačka kremšnita has a characteristic chocolate icing instead of the puff pastry top, while maintaining the puff pastry base. The classic recipe for Samoborska kremšnita is considered to be designed by Đuro Lukačić in the early 1950s, based on different earlier variants found in patisseries of Zagreb.

In Bosnia and Herzegovina, Serbia
In Bosnia and Herzegovina, Serbia, and Montenegro, the dish is known as krempita 'cream pie'. It is usually prepared with puff pastry dough. The filling is usually pure thick custard, less commonly combined with meringue (whipped egg whites and sugar) creme. A similar recipe with only meringue filling is called Šampita.

In Montenegro 

In Montenegro, the most famous are the Kotorska krempita or Kotorska pašta (Kotor Cremeschnitte). Except for the original recipe, they differ from other crempitas because they are made with three layers of dough and two layers of cream. The "Kotorska pašta" festival dedicated to this delicacy is held in Kotor every year.

In Poland

In Romania 
Romanian Cremşnit has a compacted puff pastry top and base (a weighted bake) and a stiff custard filling. It's usually sprinkled with icing sugar.

See also

 Custard pie 
 Napoleonka (kremówka)
 List of custard desserts
 Mille-feuille
 Tompouce

References

Custard desserts
Austrian pastries
German pastries
German cakes
Polish pastries
Balkan cuisine
Bosnia and Herzegovina cuisine
Slovenian desserts
Croatian pastries
Serbian cuisine
Montenegrin cuisine
Romanian pastries
Bled
Puff pastry